John Wesley Saunders III (born April 29, 1950 — February 11, 2001) was an American football defensive back. He played for the Buffalo Bills in 1972 and the San Francisco 49ers in 1974 and 1975.

References

1950 births
2001 deaths
American football defensive backs
Toledo Rockets football players
Buffalo Bills players
San Francisco 49ers players
Sportspeople from Toledo, Ohio